The 133rd (Highland) Regiment of Foot (Inverness Volunteers) was a Scottish infantry regiment in the British Army, created in 1794 and disbanded in 1795. The regiment was raised in northern Scotland by Simon Fraser, and did not see any active service; it served solely to recruit soldiers. On disbandment, the recruits were drafted into other regiments.

References

External links

Infantry regiments of the British Army
Scottish regiments
Military units and formations established in 1794
Military units and formations disestablished in 1795
1794 establishments in Great Britain
1796 disestablishments in Great Britain
1794 establishments in Scotland
1796 disestablishments in Scotland